Gaster is a German surname. 
The Dictionary of American Family Names (2003) suggests that it may be a derivation from Gast "guest".
There were 918 entries in the US white pages for this name as of 2013, the largest number (221 entries) in North Carolina. In Germany, there were 95 entries as of 2008.

Notable bearers of the name include:
Jack Gaster (1907–2007), British communist solicitor and politician. son of Moses Gaster
Jean-Paul Gaster (born 1971), American drummer
Michael Gaster, British aerospace engineer
Michael Gaster, (Born 1976) American audio engineer, and event producer
Moses Gaster (1856–1939), Romanian-born British rabbi and scholar
Ronald Gaster, U.S. born Ophthalmologist; expert in refractive surgery
Theodor Gaster (1906–1992), British-born American Biblical scholar, son of Moses Gaster

References

Sephardic surnames